Oscar Lagerstrom (November 19, 1890 – July 30, 1974) was an American sound engineer. He was nominated for an Academy Award in the category Sound Recording for the film Raffles.

Selected filmography
 Raffles (1930)
 Hallelujah, I'm a Bum (1933)

Our Gang shorts:
 Canned Fishing (1938)
 Bear Facts (1938)
 Three Men in a Tub (1938)
 Came the Brawn (1938)

References

External links

1890 births
1974 deaths
American audio engineers
People from Redwood County, Minnesota
20th-century American engineers